Lawrence M. Ward is a neuroscientist and psychophysicist at the Department of Psychology at the University of British Columbia. He studied at Harvard University (AB) and Duke University, where he received his PhD in Experimental Psychology with a minor in mathematics. His current interests are cognitive neuroscience of attention and consciousness with special emphasis on EEG and MEG studies of neuronal synchronization; information transfer between brain regions underlying cognition; psychophysics, biophysics and general theory of stochastic resonance; computational studies of neuronal oscillations and synchronization; neural plasticity; nonlinear dynamical systems theory and its applications in cognitive neuroscience. He co-authored the textbook "Sensation and Perception" with Stanley Coren, and James T. Enns, which went into six editions spanning the period 1978 to 2004.

Selected publications

 Ward, L.M. (2002). Dynamical Cognitive Science. Cambridge, MA: MIT Press (355+xv pages).
 Coren, S., Ward, L.M., & Enns, J.T.  (2004).  Sensation and Perception, Sixth Edition.  Hoboken, NJ: Wiley. (598+x pages)
 Wright, R. D., & Ward, L. M. (2008). Orienting of Attention.  New York: Oxford University Press. (292+xiv pages)

References

External links
Psychophysics lab at University of British Columbia

Academic staff of the University of British Columbia
Living people
Harvard University alumni
Duke University alumni
Year of birth missing (living people)